London Studio is a British video game developer based in London. Founded in 2002, it is a first-party studio for PlayStation Studios. The studio was most known for developing the SingStar series, as well as games for PlayStation's external peripherals including the EyeToy camera and the PlayStation VR virtual reality headset. The studio has created more than 60 titles since it was established.

History

SingStar and EyeToy 
London Studio is established in 2002 following the merger of Psygnosis's Camden studio and Team Soho, the developer behind The Getaway. As London Studio, the studio developed the SingStar series, which became extremely popular and helped broadened the appeal of the PlayStation 2 beyond the typical demographics of young male gamers. The series sold more than 20 million copies within 6 years. It also created a lot of games for Sony's EyeToy webcam, and assisted the development of other Sony titles, such as Killzone 2 and LittleBigPlanet. The studio was working on two AAA exclusives for the PlayStation 3 including Eight Days and the sequel to The Getaway, but both were cancelled by Sony Europe as Sony wanted to reallocate resources to other first-party games.

Virtual reality 
London Studio developed a virtual reality (VR) rendering technology, called LSSDK, which supports PlayStation 4 and PC. This engine was first used in PlayStation VR Worlds, which contained five virtual reality experiences: "The London Heist", "Into The Deep", "VR Luge", "Danger Ball" and "Scavenger's Odyssey". While VR Worlds received mixed reviews, "London Heist" was critically acclaimed, and the game was commercially successful. Developing titles for the virtual reality headset became the company's main focus. The studio's next game was Blood & Truth, which serves as the successor to the London Heist level. It became the first VR title to reach number 1 on the UK's retail sales chart when it was released in May 2019.

Upcoming game 
The studio is currently working on a cooperative multiplayer game for the PlayStation 5. Set in a modern fantasy London, it was described by studio head Tara Saunders as the company's "most ambitious project to-date". Players do not need to use a virtual reality headset to play this game.

Games developed

References

External links 
 

2002 establishments in England
British companies established in 2002
First-party video game developers
Software companies based in London
PlayStation Studios
Video game companies established in 2002
Video game companies of the United Kingdom
Video game development companies